is a 1958 color Japanese film directed by Umetsugu Inoue.

Cast 
 Yujiro Ishihara
 Mie Kitahara
 Kaku Takashina
 Nobuo Kaneko

References 

1958 films
Films directed by Umetsugu Inoue
Nikkatsu films
1950s Japanese films